Jason Wolfe is an American businessman and entrepreneur who is the founder and CEO of several companies, including GiftCards.com, Gift Card Granny, and GiftYa.
 
Wolfe has appeared on the MSNBC program, Morning Joe and has been profiled in Entrepreneur and Fortune. Wolfe was awarded a Diamond Award from the Pittsburgh Business Times and named Tech CEO of the Year in 2015 by the Pittsburgh Tech Council. In 2018, Wolfe was appointed the Chairman of the Board of the Pittsburgh Technology Council.

Early life and education
Wolfe grew up in a family of three children. His father left the family when Wolfe was six years old, leaving his mother to raise him and his siblings. Wolfe's mother was disabled and on welfare. In 1980 when Wolfe was 10 years old, his mother sent him to the Milton Hershey School, a boarding school for disadvantaged children in Hershey, Pennsylvania. Wolfe graduated from the school in 1987. He attributes much of his later business success to the principles he learned at the Hershey School.
 
After graduating from the Milton Hershey School, Wolfe attended Bloomsburg University of Pennsylvania. He graduated with a BS in Marketing in 1992. Wolfe spent two years as a whitewater rafting guide in West Virginia before deciding to move to Pittsburgh. Soon after his move in 1994, he was involved in an accident that required him to undergo two spinal surgeries. While recovering, he wound up living out of his jeep. He taught himself how to code by using books at the local library and CompUSA's Building the Perfect Web among others

Career
In 1995, Wolfe founded the first online coupon site, known initially as CouponsDirect.com. The site was later renamed to MyCoupons.com. The business provided coupons for companies. In the first year of operation, MyCoupons only earned around $1,000. By 1999, however, the business garnered over $1 million in annual sales and 20 million page views per month. The company also had around 3 million registered members. The company was sold to a competitor, Save.com, for roughly $23 million in 2000. Because this occurred around the time of the dot-com bust, Wolfe only received about $2 million total from the sale. He reacquired MyCoupons.com in 2002.
 
After selling and reacquiring MyCoupons, Wolfe began to build Direct Response Technologies. Its flagship product was DirectTrack, an affiliate tracking technology and platform. By 2006, DirectTrack had tracked billions of impressions and tens of millions of clicks per month. Wolfe sold Direct Response Technologies and DirectTrack to Digital River in 2006. He repurchased the GiftCards.com domain and rebranded and relaunched the site in 2008. He also relaunched MyCoupons.com in 2007. Both companies became subsidiaries of Wolfe, LLC, a holding company that Wolfe founded in 2007. Other subsidiaries that are part of Wolfe, LLC include Omni Prepaid and Swapagift.com. Swapagift.com, later rebranded to SaveYa.com, closed in 2019 due to financial issues. 
 
In 2009, GiftCards.com recorded $44 million in sales. In 2011, MyCoupons was earning 2 million page views per month and maintained a network of 6,000 to 8,000 retailers across the United States. In 2013, Wolfe invested $1million US into GiftYa. In 2020, Wolfe decided to shrink the GiftYa team as loses were mounting and GiftYa was found to not be the success that was envisioned. Several employees from the GiftYa team were fired in late March. After GiftCards.com was acquired in early 2016 by Blackhawk Network Holdings, Wolfe became Gift Card Granny's CEO. In December 2016, Wolfe moved the company to Green Tree, Pennsylvania (a Pittsburgh suburb) to the same facility that had earlier housed GiftCards.com. Wolfe also invested into Forever.com in 2016 and in 2018 invested into Wonder Technologies.

Gift Card Granny announced its alliance with The National Cyber-Forensics & Training Alliance in 2017 to help reduce fraud in the online gift card market. In addition, Wolfe launched Compromised, LLC in 2017 to aggregate compromised credential data and reinvest the resources to protect consumers against cybercrime threats and fraud. Compromised was shut down in late 2019 due to mounting losses and a failure to attract large customers. 

In partnership with Steven VanFleet, Wolfe started Sentral, LLC in 2018. Sentral provides a single point of integration for Card-Linked-Offer program providers by working with the Debit Networks. Sentral, LLC is a subsidiary of Wolfe, LLC. In 2018, Wolfe invested into and joined the board of directors for Wonder Technologies, Inc. In 2020, Wolfe sold Sentral to PNC fintech incubator, numLLC.

Recognition and awards
Ernst & Young named him the 2011 Entrepreneur of the Year for the Western Pennsylvania and West Virginia region. In 2013, he was given the Pennsylvania Governor's ImPAct Award in the Entrepreneur category. In 2014, he was named the Milton Hershey School's "Alumnus of the Year." In 2015, the Pittsburgh Business Times honored Wolfe with a Diamond award. In 2015, Wolfe was named Tech CEO of the Year by the Pittsburgh Tech Council. In 2017, The Pittsburgh Venture Capital Association presented Wolfe with the Outstanding Entrepreneur Award. In 2018, The Pittsburgh Technology Council elected Wolfe as the chairman of the organization's board of directors. Wolfe was selected to the board of director's of Family Design Resources, Inc in 2018 to help with child welfare and adoption in Pennsylvania. Carnegie Science Center awarded Jason with Entrepreneur award in 2019.

References 

Living people
American business executives
People from Pittsburgh
Year of birth missing (living people)
Bloomsburg University of Pennsylvania alumni